Bussow is a German surname. Notable people with name include:

 Conrad Bussow (1552 or 1553–1617), German mercenary 
 Johann Büssow (born 1973), German historian

See also
Busso (surname)
Busson (surname)

German-language surnames